Forest Park may refer to:

 A type of park, see Park#Forest park

Towns and villages
Forest Park, Ontario, Canada
Forest Park, Georgia, US
Forest Park, Illinois, US
Forest Park, Indiana, US
Forest Park, Ohio, Hamilton County, US
Forest Park, Ottawa County, Ohio, US
Forest Park, Oklahoma, US
Forest Park, Bracknell Forest, Berkshire, UK

Parks
Ards Forest Park, County Donegal, Republic of Ireland
Forest Park Nature Center, Peoria, Illinois, US
Forest Park (Springfield, Massachusetts), US, designed by Frederick Law Olmsted
Forest Park (St. Louis, Missouri), US
Forest Park (Ballston Lake, New York), US
Forest Park (Queens, New York), US
Forest Park (Portland, Oregon), US
Forest Park, a park in Everett, Washington, US
Gongqing Forest Park, Shanghai, China
Lavizan Forest Park, Tehran, Iran
Forest parks of New Zealand
Forest parks of Scotland

Neighborhoods
Forest Park, Baltimore, Maryland, US
Forest Park, Columbus, Ohio, US
Forest Park, Springfield, Massachusetts, US
Forest Park, Detroit, Michigan, US

Public schools
Forest Park High School (Indiana), Ferdinand, Indiana, US
Forest Park High School (Maryland), Baltimore, Maryland, US
Forest Park High School (Virginia), Prince William County, Virginia, US

Other uses
Forest Park Cemetery, Brunswick, New York, US
Forest Park Country Club, Adams, Massachusetts, US
List of Forest Parks of Thailand, a protected area category in Thailand

See also
Park Forest (disambiguation)
Urban forest
Urban park